

Translations into Old Church Slavonic 
The oldest translation of the Bible into a Slavic language, Old Church Slavonic, has close connections with the activity of the two apostles to the Slavs, Cyril and Methodius, in Great Moravia in 864–865. It was implemented at the Preslav Literary School, although it was attributed to Cyril and Methodius. The oldest manuscripts use either the so-called Cyrillic or the Glagolitic alphabets. Cyrillic reflects the Greek majuscule writing style of the 9th century with the addition of new characters for Slavic sounds not used in the Greek of that time. Glagolitic writing differs from any other writing system; it went out of use as late as the 20th century.

The oldest manuscripts use the Glagolitic script, which is older than the Cyrillic. The oldest manuscripts extant belong to the 10th or 11th century.

Church Slavonic versions 

The first complete collection of Biblical books in the Church Slavonic language originated in the Grand Duchy of Moscow in the last decade of the 15th century. It was completed in 1499 under the auspices of Archbishop Gennady of Novgorod (in office: 1484–1504); the translators/compilers of the Old Testament based their work partly on the Vulgate and partly on the Septuagint tradition. The New Testament text relies on the Old Church Slavonic translation. The 1499 Bible, called the Gennady's Bible is now housed in the State History Museum on Red Square in Moscow.

During the 16th century a greater interest arose in the Bible in South and West Russia, owing to the controversies between adherents of the Orthodox Church and the Latin Catholics and Greek-Catholics. In the second half of the 16th century the Gospels, Acts, and Epistles, and parts of the Psalter were often printed at Lviv and Vilnius, though the oldest printed edition of the Acts and Epistles was issued at Moscow in 1564.

In 1581 Ivan Fyodorov published the first printed edition of the Church Slavonic Bible at Ostrog: Fyodorov's edition used a number of Greek manuscripts, besides Gennady's Bible. But neither the Gennady's nor the Ostrog Bible was satisfactory, and in 1663 a second somewhat revised edition of the latter was published at Moscow – the Moscow Bible (Московская Библия).

In 1712, Tsar Peter the Great issued an ukaz ordering the printed Slavonic text to be carefully compared with the Greek of the Septuagint and to be made in every respect conformable to it. The revision, completed in 1724, was ordered to be printed, but the death of Peter (1725) prevented the execution of the order. The synodal library in Moscow retains the manuscript of the Old Testament of this revision.

Under the Empress Elizabeth the work of revision was resumed by an ukaz issued in 1744, and in 1751 a revised "Elizabeth" Bible, as it is called, appeared. Three other editions were published in 1756, 1757, and 1759, the second somewhat revised. All later reprints of the Russian Church Bible are based upon this second edition, which has become the authorized version of the Russian Orthodox Church.

References

External links 
 
 Bible in Church Slavonic language (Wikisource), (PDF), (iPhone), (Android) 

 
Old Church Slavonic literature
History of Christianity in Russia